Hteehlaing Village is located in Ywangan Township of Danuland, southern Shan State. The village code is 2018811. According to 2014 census, a total of 918 people live there, including 454 men and 464 women.

References 

Populated places in Shan State